A list of films produced by the Marathi language film industry based in Maharashtra in the year 1977.

1977 Releases
A list of Marathi films released in 1977.

References

Lists of 1977 films by country or language
1977 in Indian cinema
1977